Bob Bertemes (born 24 May 1993) is a Luxembourgish athlete specialising in the shot put. He finished fifth at the 2015 European Indoor Championships.

His personal bests in the event are 22.22 metres outdoors (Luxembourg City 2019) and 21.03 metres indoors (Potsdam 2019). Both are current national records.

Competition record

1No mark in the final

References

1993 births
Living people
Luxembourgian male shot putters
World Athletics Championships athletes for Luxembourg
Athletes (track and field) at the 2015 European Games
European Games competitors for Luxembourg
Sportspeople from Luxembourg City
Athletes (track and field) at the 2020 Summer Olympics
Olympic athletes of Luxembourg